The Sign of Hertoghe or Queen Anne's sign is a thinning or loss of the outer third of the eyebrows, and is a classical sign of hypothyroidism or atopic dermatitis, but it can also be detected in lepromatous leprosy. The sign is named after the Belgian Internist Eugene Ludovic Christian Hertoghe (April 5, 1860–January 3, 1928), who was a native of Antwerp, and was the first pioneer in thyroid function research.


Queen Anne's sign 

The association with Anne of Denmark is based on portraiture, although history does not suggest that she suffered an underactive thyroid. The eponym is disputed by some, though it has been suggested that Anne of France, Anne of Brittany, Anne of Austria, Anne Boleyn and Anne of Cleves may all be eliminated as candidates.

References

Thyroid disease
Symptoms and signs: Endocrinology, nutrition, and metabolism
Anne of Denmark